Abdulaziz Makame (born 24 June 1996) is a Tanzanian football striker who plays for Young Africans.

References

1996 births
Living people
Zanzibari footballers
Tanzanian footballers
Association football forwards
Young Africans S.C. players
Zanzibar international footballers
Tanzania international footballers
Tanzanian Premier League players